The Bus Open Data Service (BODS) is a government-funded service in England, established in 2020 as part of the Bus Services Act 2017. It was created in a partnership between ITO World, the Department for Transport and KPMG.

The service is described by ITO World as "an international first" as it provides Open Data of bus timetables, fares and Automatic Vehicle Location of buses across England.

Data Implementation

As part of the requirements set by the Department for Transport in The Public Service Vehicles (Open Data) (England) Regulations 2020, the Bus Open Data Service set deadlines for operators to provide data.

The implementation requirements only applied in England

31 December 2020 - Obligation to provide bus timetable data to the Bus Open Data Service.
7 January 2021 - Obligation to provide vehicle location and basic fares and tickets data to the Bus Open Data Service.
7 January 2023 - Obligation to provide complex fares and ticket data to the Bus Open Data Service.

Uses

Following the introduction of the Bus Open Data, there have been a number of uses for the system.

The website Bustimes.org utilises data from BODS to supply information such as timetable, fares and vehicle location information via an API link, with the vehicle location information displaying on a map.
The Traffic Commissioners for Great Britain, in their 2020/21 annual report, stated that use of the Bus Open Data Service would "make available more data than ever before on an operator’s performance."
An article in TransportXtra explained how data from BODS can be used to plan an electrified bus fleet

Critism

Despite providing fare, time and vehicle location, the Department for Transport has ruled out including key accessibility information on bus stops, stations and vehicles despite the Bus Services Act making specific provision for open data, 'for the purpose of facilitating travel by disabled persons'.

A number of operators have struggled to provide the data required by the deadlines provided by the Bus Open Data Service, requiring providers to implement alternative solutions.

The Confederation of Passenger Transport, and operators of home-to-school transport, criticised the requirement for operators to provide data about registered home-to-school bus services, and the exemption of Section 22 community bus services.

Writing in Buses magazine, Centrebus Group owner Julian Peddle called the service "a horrendously bureaucratic and over-engineered system designed by well-meaning but clueless officials in London. It’s running late, does not work properly, and has involved the industry and local authorities in vast amounts of needless work. It’s supposedly been running since January 2021, but has not improved things in the wilds of Shropshire, and never will, because government bureaucrats don’t understand the problem, so have no chance of solving it."

References

External links
 Bus Open Data Service (dft.gov.uk)

Open data
2020 establishments in England
Department for Transport
2020 establishments in the United Kingdom
Government agencies established in 2020
Bus Services Act 2017
Travel technology
Public transport in the United Kingdom